In September 2018, the UEFA Nations League starring all European nations officially commenced. This competition has been created to make the international breaks more competitive and interesting and remove as much friendly matches as possible. The teams are divided into four leagues of four groups, from League A to League D. The winners of each group from League A get to play the Finals, constituted of the semi-finals, a third-place play-off, and the final.
 
Since the first season, Portugal has always remained in League A, the highest level of this competition. Portugal is the first ever winner of the UEFA Nations League, topping their group against Italy and Poland, knocking out Switzerland in the semi-finals and beating the Netherlands in the final. They couldn't retain the trophy in the next season after finishing second to France in the group stage.

UEFA Nations League record

*Draws include knockout matches decided on penalties.
**Group stage played home and away. Flag shown represents host nation for the finals stage. Red border colour indicates the finals stage will be held on home soil.

List of matches

2018–19 UEFA Nations League

Group stage

Knockout phase
Semi-final

Final

2020–21 UEFA Nations League

Group stage

2022–23 UEFA Nations League

Group stage

Goalscorers

Bold players are still active with the national team.

Notes

References

External links
Portugal profile on the official UEFA website

Countries at the UEFA Nations League
History of the Portugal national football team